State Road 31 (SR 31) is a state highway in Southwest Florida in Lee, Charlotte, and DeSoto counties. It is about 36 miles (58 kilometers) long. The entire roadway is two lanes wide, even near Fort Myers.  The highway crosses the Caloosahatchee River via the Wilson Pigott Bridge, a small drawbridge, a mile north of the southern terminus. The northern terminus is with an intersection of SR 70 near Arcadia. The southern terminus is with an intersection of SR 80 near Fort Myers Shores. The route is home to G. Pierce Wood Memorial Hospital, replacing the old De Soto Aircraft Field.

History
Originally designated State Road 2, the route was redesignated State Road 31 in 1945 as part of a statewide renumbering.

Prior to the construction of the Wilson Pigott Bridge in 1960, State Road 31 crossed the Caloosahatchee River about three miles farther east of the current bridge.  Just north of Fort Myers Shores, it travelled east along North River Road (then-State Road 78) and crossed the river on a swing bridge into Olga, where it continued to State Road 80 along what is today Olga Drive.  The current route south of North River Road carried State Road 78 at the time.

The entity formed to Babcock Ranch.

Former Naples segment
Prior to the 1980s, State Road 31 was a discontinuous route with an additional segment in Naples.  This segment has since been turned over to county control (CR 31) and is known as Airport-Pulling Road.

Major intersections

References

External links

031
031
031
031